Carnival Pride is a  operated by Carnival Cruise Line. Built by Kværner Masa-Yards at its Helsinki New Shipyard in Helsinki, Finland, she was laid down on March 30, 2000, launched on March 29, 2001 and completed and delivered to Carnival on December 12, 2001. She was christened by American scientist and astronaut Tamara Jernigan in Port Canaveral, Florida, on January 7, 2002.

Carnival Pride has 1,062 passenger cabins. She is currently based out of Tampa, FL.

Areas of operation

Carnival Pride began sailing from Port Canaveral, in January 2002 to Eastern and Western Caribbean ports. Then, from 2002 to March 2009, she sailed year-round cruises from Long Beach, California to the Mexican Riviera.

On March 22, 2009, she sailed a Panama Canal voyage ending in Miami, Florida, and sailed Caribbean cruises out of that port until April 2009.

Since April 2009, Carnival Pride was the first ship to sail year-round Bahamas/Caribbean cruises out of Baltimore, Maryland. From Baltimore, she also sailed a two-day cruise to nowhere without making any port of call from November 2 to 4, 2012, as a result of canceling an October departure due to closed port traffic after Hurricane Sandy.

Carnival Pride sailed out of Tampa in October 2014 until returning to Baltimore in March 2015. In November 2021 Carnival Pride returned to Tampa, with the Carnival Legend taking its place in Baltimore.

Facilities

In October 2014 Carnival Pride entered dry dock for scrubber installation and refurbishment.

The ship is scheduled to undergo another refurbishment in early 2019.

Accidents and incidents 
On May 8, 2016, the Carnival Pride collided into the pier in Baltimore, causing a terminal gangway to collapse and crush 3 cars. Nobody was hurt in the incident.

References
Notes

Bibliography

External links

Official website

Ships built in Helsinki
Pride
Panamax cruise ships
2001 ships